Avatha rhynchophora is a species of moth of the family Erebidae first described by Prout in 1924. It is found in Papua, where it has been recorded from Mount Kunupi, Langda and the Utakwa River.

References

Moths described in 1924
Avatha
Moths of Indonesia